Out is a 2017 Slovak drama film directed by György Kristóf. It was screened in the Un Certain Regard section at the 2017 Cannes Film Festival. The film received a grant of 3.5 million crowns from the State Cinematography Fund.

Cast
 Judit Bárdos as Daughter
 Attila Bocsárszky as Pišta
 Éva Bandor as Wife
 Guna Zarina as Gaida
 Ieva Norvele as Activist

References

External links
 Official Web
 Online Stream
 

2017 films
2017 drama films
2017 directorial debut films
Slovak drama films
Slovak-language films